Nguyễn Thị Hoàng Na (born 26 October 1955) is a Vietnamese athlete. She competed in the women's long jump at the 1980 Summer Olympics.

References

External links
 

1955 births
Living people
Athletes (track and field) at the 1980 Summer Olympics
Vietnamese female long jumpers
Olympic athletes of Vietnam
Place of birth missing (living people)
21st-century Vietnamese women